Ariyalai (Ariyāleyi) is a suburb of the city of Jaffna in northern Sri Lanka. The suburb is divided into eight village officer divisions whose combined population was 10,750 at the 2012 census.

References

External links

Nallur DS Division
Suburbs of Jaffna